The African Morning Post was a daily newspaper in Accra, Gold Coast, published by City Press Ltd. Editorial and Pub. Its editor-in-chief in 1934 was Dr Nnamdi Azikiwe, who later also founded several newspapers in Nigeria, including the West African Pilot in 1937.

See also
Media of Ghana
List of newspapers in Ghana

References

External links
 Today in African American History
 Nnamdi Azikiwe Biography

Publications established in 1934
Newspapers published in Ghana
Mass media in Accra
1934 establishments in Gold Coast (British colony)